Rosalín Elina Ángeles Rojas (born July 23, 1985 in Santo Domingo) is a retired volleyball player from the Dominican Republic, who won the gold medal with the women's national team at the 2003 Pan American Games in her home town Santo Domingo, Dominican Republic.

Playing as a setter she also competed at the 2007 FIVB World Grand Prix for her native country, wearing the #2 jersey.

Beach volleyball
She won the gold medal of the Dominican Republic National Championship 2006 playing with Cinthia Piñeiro. In 2007, she played the first leg of the NORCECA Beach Volleyball Circuit playing with Dahiana Burgos, finishing in 10th place.

Ángeles won the gold medal in the 2014 National Championship, playing with Ana Binet.

Clubs
  Deportivo Nacional (2002–2003)
  Mirador (2004–2005)
  Bameso (2005–2006)
  Deportivo Nacional (2007)

Awards

Beach volleyball
 2006 National Championship  Gold Medal
 2014 National Championship  Gold Medal

References

External links
 2002 FIVB profile
 FIVB profile

1985 births
Living people
Dominican Republic women's volleyball players
Volleyball players at the 2003 Pan American Games
Volleyball players at the 2007 Pan American Games
Pan American Games gold medalists for the Dominican Republic
Pan American Games medalists in volleyball
Opposite hitters
Setters (volleyball)
Medalists at the 2003 Pan American Games